Coleophora pennella is a moth of the family Coleophoridae. It is found in most of Europe.

Adults are on wing from June to July.

The larvae feed on alkanet (Anchusa officinalis), houndstongue (Cynoglossum officinale), Italian viper's bugloss (Echium italicum), viper's bugloss (Echium vulgare), common gromwell  (Lithospermum officinale), forget-me-nots (Myosotis species), monkswort (Nonea species), Onosma, alkenet (Pentaglottis), lungwort (Pulmonaria officinalis) and common comfrey (Symphytum officinale). Young larvae feed on the developing seeds and hibernate in their first case which is made of the tip of a petal. After hibernation, they make a laterally flattened, composite leaf case. Fleck mines are made at the margin of the leaves. The mouth angle is about 70°. Full-grown larvae can be found from mid May to early June.

References

pennella
Leaf miners
Moths described in 1775
Moths of Europe
Taxa named by Michael Denis
Taxa named by Ignaz Schiffermüller